Sdot Yam (lit. Sea Fields) is a kibbutz in the Haifa District of Israel. Located on the shore of the Mediterranean Sea, it falls under the jurisdiction of Hof HaCarmel Regional Council.

It was founded in 1936 and moved to its present site at the southern border of the ancient city and archeological ruins of Caesarea, in 1940.

History

Northern location (1936–40)
Sdot Yam was established in 1936, in the region, just north of Haifa, called the Krayot. It was founded at the urging of David Ben-Gurion during the period when the British were refusing to allow Jews to enter Mandatory Palestine. It was ostensibly based on fishing, but was in reality a base for the Palmach used to smuggle clandestine immigrants, mostly Jewish refugees from Europe, into Palestine. Yossi Harel, famous for being the commander of SS Exodus and three other such ships, is buried at Sdot Yam.

Permanent location (after 1940)
In 1940 the kibbutz was moved to its present location south of Caesarea. Its new residents were a gar'in from the Mahanot HaOlim youth group.

Economy
The kibbutz originally based its economy on fishing, but today concentrates on land-based agriculture. It manages a banana plantation, avocado trees, and a herd of dairy cattle. The kibbutz's major source of income comes from the marketing and manufacturing of engineered quartz surfaces under the Caesarstone brand. In 2013, the kibbutz owned a 58 percent stake in the company, which makes stone counter tops for kitchens and bathrooms. It sold the majority of it in October 2012. .

Landmarks
The Hannah Szenes house is a study center founded in the name of Hungarian-born Hannah Szenes and the other paratroopers who were sent from Mandatory Palestine to war-torn Europe in 1944 to save Hungarian Jews.

Notable people

Shimshon Brokman (born 1957), Olympic competitive sailor
Nola Chilton, theatre-director, acting teacher, winner of the Israel Prize for Theater, 2013
Gal Fridman, Olympic gold-medal-winning windsurfer
Aharon Megged, author and playwright
Itzhak Nir (born 1940), Olympic competitive sailor
Hannah Szenes, Special Operations Executive (SOE) paratrooper parachuted by the British Army into Yugoslavia during the Second World War to assist in the rescue of Hungarian Jews about to be deported to the German death camp at Auschwitz

References

External links

Official website 
Hannah Szenes House

Kibbutzim
Kibbutz Movement
Populated places established in 1940
1940 establishments in Mandatory Palestine
Populated places in Haifa District